FiR 1 (Finland Reactor 1; also sometimes referred to as Otaniemi research reactor, Otaniemi reactor, TKK reactor or VTT reactor) was Finland's first nuclear reactor. It was a research reactor that was located in the Otaniemi campus area in the city of Espoo. The TRIGA Mark II reactor had a thermal power of 250 kilowatts. It started operation in 1962, and it was permanently shut down in 2015. At first, the reactor was operated by Helsinki University of Technology (TKK), and since 1971 by VTT Technical Research Centre of Finland.

In addition to research, the reactor was used for production of radioactive isotopes for industrial measurements. It was used also for neutron activation analysis of geological and biological materials. Lunar soil samples from Apollo 12 were analyzed with FiR 1. Radiation damage to equipment has been investigated with the reactor. For example, magnetometers for the ITER fusion reactor have been irradiated with FiR 1. University students have performed exercises with the reactor. After the year 2000, the most significant use of the reactor was boron neutron capture therapy for patients with a cancer in the head or neck area.

Technology 
FiR 1 was a TRIGA Mark II reactor, manufactured by the US company General Atomics. The original thermal power of the reactor was 100 kilowatts. In 1967 the reactor was uprated to 250 kilowatts. The heat was not utilized for anything because the reactor was operated only a few hours a day.

The water acted as a coolant, neutron moderator, and radiation protection.

The reactor had 79 fuel rods. The fuel material was uranium zirconium hydride (UZrH), which contained 8–12 % of uranium. The fuel enrichment was 20% of uranium-235. There was a graphite reflector above, below, and around the reactor core. The reflector scattered back into the core some of the neutrons that escaped from the core. The reactor pool was surrounded by a concrete biological shield, which acted as a radiation protection in the horizontal direction. The reactor had four control rods made of boron carbide.

A feature of the fuel material, uranium zirconium hydride, is a strong negative feedback between the temperature and the reactivity. As a result, an uncontrolled chain reaction is physically impossible. The strong feedback could be utilized for generating power pulses. A control rod was ejected from the core with pressurized air, raising the reactor power thousand-fold, to 250 megawatts. This caused an increase of the fuel temperature, and the negative feedback stopped the chain reaction. A power pulse lasted only 30 milliseconds.

History 

A contract for buying the research reactor was signed in 1960. The research reactor project was preparation for constructing a nuclear power plant in Finland. A research reactor was needed for training of personnel for the power reactors.

FiR 1 started operation in 1962. In 1967 its power was uprated from 100 to 250 kilowatts. At first, the reactor was operated by Helsinki University of Technology. In 1971 the Finnish government transferred the reactor to VTT Technical Research Centre of Finland. The reactor building and the land are owned by Aalto University Campus & Real Estate.

A boron neutron capture therapy (BNCT) facility was constructed next to the reactor in the 1990s. Over 300 cancer patient irradiations were given in 1999–2011. The patients showed improved tumor control and survival. The company that organized the therapy, Boneca Ltd., went bankrupt in January 2012. Then VTT decided to shut down the reactor because its operation cost about 500,000 euros per year. The reactor was permanently shut down in 2015 by removing several fuel rods from the core.

Dismantling 

The first step in the dismantling project was removing the fuel from the reactor. Then other radioactive parts (internal parts of the core, the reactor pool, the concrete biological shield, BNCT facility, and the primary cooling circuit) will be dismantled. The spent fuel and most parts of the reactor core are high-level waste. Other radioactive dismantling waste is classified as low- and intermediate-level waste. The goal is to limit the collective radiation dose to the dismantling staff to 10 milliman-sieverts. The reactor building will be cleaned so that there will be no limitations to its future use.

There were a total of 103 spent fuel rods in the reactor building. They contained  of uranium in total. The reactor used very little fuel because its power was so low and it operated only a few hours a day. Some of the fuel rods were in the reactor for its entire 53 year operating time. The spent fuel does not need cooling because its decay heat power is so low. In addition to the spent fuel, 24 unused fuel rods were stored in the building. They contained  of uranium in total.

The FiR 1 fuel originates from the United States, and it belongs to the U.S. Foreign Research Reactor Spent Nuclear Fuel Acceptance program. The program is intended to prevent proliferation of nuclear materials. Finland’s Nuclear Energy Act prohibits export of nuclear waste. However, the law has an exception, according to which the prohibition does not apply to waste from a research reactor. In February 2021, the fuel of the reactor was transported to Denver, where the United States Geological Survey will use the fuel for several years in its reactor. Then the United States will take care of the spent fuel in Idaho National Laboratory. Most of the dangerous radioactivity of the used fuel will vanish in a thousand years (but some level of radioactivity will survive for much longer).

VTT has signed a contract with Fortum on the dismantling of the reactor. Fortum is going to begin the dismantling at the end of 2022. Because the reactor was small, the amount of waste generated is also small, especially when compared to the amount of waste from decommissioning of a full-size nuclear power plant. Most of the waste will be concrete. VTT is going to transport the dismantling waste by road to the low- and intermediate-level waste repository either in Loviisa or in Olkiluoto. Final disposal of decommissioning waste from the reactor will be performed in due course in a final disposal facility in Finnish bedrock. The decommissioning waste is packaged into concrete boxes for final disposal; since the decommissioning waste does not contain long-lived radioactive isotopes, the packages are designed to last only at least 500 years.

FiR 1 is Finland’s first nuclear facility to be dismantled. The lessons-learned from the research reactor dismantling project will be used for preparation of the decommissioning of Finnish nuclear power plants. In 2018, the Finnish government decided to give VTT a 13.5 million euros special grant for dismantling the research reactor. The Council of State of Finland granted a decommissioning license (required by Finnish nuclear law) in June 2021. The reactor will be dismantled in 2022–2023; the process is expected to take about a year. After the reactor and related components are dismantled, the reactor building will be decontaminated and, after thorough checks and measurements to ensure that the building is safe radiation-wise, the building will be released to use for other purposes. Before the dismantling work of the reactor started, the reactor building was not contaminated and its radiation level was the same as the background radiation level. Many Finnish buildings are exposed to much higher levels of radiation than the reactor building, due to natural sources such as the bedrock (especially radon gas) or building materials (e.g. granite). There was no soil contamination at the site of the reactor before dismatling and demolition work began.

References 

Nuclear research reactors
Nuclear power in Finland